The Hermann AVA is an American Viticultural Area located in Gasconade County, Missouri, and entirely contained within the larger Ozark Mountain AVA.  The wine appellation is located on the southern side of the Missouri River near the town of Hermann, about halfway between St. Louis and Jefferson City.  The AVA covers the northernmost hills of the Ozark Plateau with many of the 200 acres (80 hectares) of vineyards planted along hillside locations. As of 2007, seven wineries were producing wine in appellation, including Missouri's largest winery, Stone Hill Winery.

Growing conditions in the area have been compared to those in southern and eastern Germany. The hardiness zone is 6a. A wide variety of grapes are grown in Hermann, including Vitis vinifera, Vitis labrusca, and French hybrids.

History

The Hermann area was founded in 1836 by settlers from the German Settlement Society of Philadelphia. Pioneer leader George Bayer selected a location along the southern banks of the Missouri river for its similarities to the Rheingau region that many of the settlers came from. The area was named Hermann after Arminius of Germania, a 1st-century German hero who opposed the Roman empire. The founders wanted the area to be a safe haven for German immigrants in America where they could maintain their culture and heritage despite the pressures to assimilate. The settlers established a joint-stock company and advertised widely throughout the United States and Germany, seeking farmers, laborers, winemakers and artisans to establish what they called a "German Athens of the West".

Winemaking and viticulture were quickly established in Hermann and by 1852 there were more than 470 acres (190 hectares) planted to grape vines. Several modern Hermann wineries can trace their origins to this period. Stone Hill's cellars were constructed in 1847, the Hermanhoff Winery was founded in 1852 and in 1855, the Adam Puchta Winery was founded by immigrants from Oberkotzau, Bavaria who had struck gold during the California Gold Rush before returning to Hermann. At the turn of the 20th century, Stone Hill Winery was the third largest winery in the world, producing over 1,250,000 gallons (4,730,000 liters) of wine and achieving favorable results at international wine competitions.

Prohibition in the United States completely wiped out the commercial wine industry in Hermann. The large underground cellars of Stone Hill Winery were converted to mushroom farms and most of the grapevines were pulled out and the land planted with corn, oat, wheat and barley fields. Follow the repeal of prohibition in 1933, it took several decades for the Hermann wine industry to recover with Stone Hill reopening in 1965, Hermannhof in 1974 and Adam Puchta in 1989. Today there is around 200 acres of grapevines planted with the Hermann Wine Trail being a frequent tourist location in the Missouri Rhineland.

Grape varieties and wines

A wide variety of grapes are grown in Hermann, including the Vitis vinifera Riesling and Cabernet Sauvignon, the Vitis labrusca Concord and Catawba, the Vitis aestivalis variety Norton (Cynthiana), and several hybrid varieties including Chambourcin, Seyval blanc, St. Vincent, Steuben, Traminette, Vidal blanc, Vignoles, Chardonel, Cayuga, Edelweiss and De Chaunac.

The region also produces a wide variety of wine styles ranging from sweet late harvest dessert wines and fortified wines, including port-style and solera made sherry-style wines to drier still red, white and rosés. Many fruit wines are also produced, usually from cherry, strawberry or raspberries.

See also
List of wineries in Missouri
  TTB AVA Map

References

American Viticultural Areas
Geography of Gasconade County, Missouri
Missouri wine
1983 establishments in Missouri